Passion is an album by American guitarist Steve Laury released in 1991, and recorded for Denon Records. The album reached No. 1 on the Billboard, R&R, Gavin, PAC Contemporary Jazz charts.

AllMusic noted Laury "displays the versatility of a studio musician, ranging from a close Wes Montgomery imitation to hints of rock and funk".

Track listing
(all tracks written by Steve Laury and Ron Satterfield)
All The Way - 4:48
In My Dreams - 4:30
Getaway - 4:50
I Need You So - 4:14
I Like That - 4:00
Come Back To Me - 5:10
No Kidding - 4:34
Passion - 5:10
Jeananne - 4:32

Personnel
Steve Laury - guitar
Ron Satterfield - keyboards, bass, vocals, guitar
Duncan Moore - drums, percussion

Charts

References

External links
Passion at Discogs
Passion at AllMusic
Steve Laury plays In My Dreams at YouTube

1991 albums
Denon Records albums